GKM may refer to:

General Kumaramangalam Colony or "GKM Colony" in Chennai
GKM College of Engineering and Technology in Chennai
Generalized Kac–Moody algebra
Grupo Kalise Menorquina, Spanish ice cream company
Gebauer Kényszermeghajtású Motorgéppuska, machine gun designed by Franz Gebauer
Gerard Klauer Mattison, company acquired by BMO Capital Markets in 2003
Grenzkommando Mitte (Border Command Center), part of the Border Troops of the German Democratic Republic